A cyclecar was a type of small, lightweight and inexpensive car manufactured in Europe and the United States between 1910 and the early 1920s. The purpose of cyclecars was to fill a gap in the market between the motorcycle and the car. A key characteristic was that it could only accommodate two passengers sitting tandem style or passenger behind the driver.

The demise of cyclecars was due to larger cars – such as the Citroën Type C, Austin 7 and Morris Cowley – becoming more affordable. Small, inexpensive vehicles reappeared after World War II, and were known as microcars.

Characteristics 

Cyclecars were  propelled by engines with a single cylinder or V-twin configuration (or occasionally a four cylinder engine), which were often air-cooled. Sometimes motorcycle engines were used, in which case the motorcycle gearbox was also used.

All cyclecars were required to have clutches and variable gears. This requirement could be fulfilled by even the simplest devices such as provision for slipping the belt on the pulley to act as a clutch, and varying of the pulley diameter to change the gear ratio. Methods such as belt drive or chain drive were used to transmit power to the drive wheel(s), often to one wheel only, so that a differential was not required.

The bodies were lightweight and sometimes offered minimal weather protection or comfort features.

The rise of cyclecars was a direct result of reduced taxation both for registration and annual licences of lightweight small-engined cars. On 14 December 1912, at a meeting of the Federation Internationale des Clubs Moto Cycliste, it was formally decided that there should be an international classification of cyclecars to be accepted by the United Kingdom, Canada, United States, France, The Netherlands, Belgium, Italy, Austria and Germany. As a result of this meeting, the following classes of cyclecars were defined:

Origins 
From 1898 to 1910, automobile production quickly expanded. Light cars of that era were commonly known as voiturettes. The smaller cyclecars appeared around 1910 with a boom shortly before the outbreak of the First World War, with Temple Press launching The Cyclecar magazine on 27 November 1912 (later renamed The Light Car and Cyclecar), and the formation of the Cyclecar Club (which later evolved into British Automobile Racing Club). From 1912, the Motor Cycle show at Olympia became the Motor Cycle and Cycle Car Show.

The number of cyclecar manufacturers was less than a dozen in each of the UK and France in 1911, but by 1914, there were over 100 manufacturers in each country, as well as others in Germany, Austria and other European countries. By 1912, the A.C. Sociable was described as "one of the most popular cycle cars on the road, both for pleasure and for business", though another source states that the "Humberette" was the most popular of cycle cars at that time. Many of the numerous makes were relatively short-lived, but several brands achieved greater longevity, including Bédélia (1910-1925), GN (1910-1923) and Morgan (1910–present).

Demise 
By the early 1920s, the days of the cyclecar were numbered. Mass producers, such as Ford, were able to reduce their prices to undercut those of the usually small cyclecar makers. Similar affordable cars were offered in Europe, such as the Citroën 5CV, Austin 7 or Morris Cowley.

The cyclecar boom was over. The majority of cyclecar manufacturers closed down. Some companies such as Chater-Lea survived by returning to the manufacture of motorcycles.

After the Second World War, small, economic cars were again in demand and a new set of manufacturers appeared. The cyclecar name did not reappear however, and the cars were called microcars by enthusiasts and bubble cars by the general population.

Motor racing 
Several motor racing events for cyclecars were run between 1913 and 1920. The first race dedicated to cyclecars was organised by the Automobile Club de France in 1913, followed by a Cyclecar GP at Le Mans in 1920. The Auto Cycle Union was to have introduced cycle car racing on the Isle of Man in September 1914, but the race was abandoned due to the onset of the war.

List of cyclecars by country

Argentina 

 Viglione

Austria 

 Austro, 1913–14
 Grofri

Belgium 

 CAP (de:CAP)
 SCH

Canada 

 Baby Car
 Campagna T-Rex
 Dart Cycle Car Co
 Glen Motor Company
 Gramm
 Holden-Morgan
 Welker-Doerr

Czechoslovakia 

 Aero 500 
 Novo
 Vaja

Denmark 

 Dana

France 

 Able
 Ajams
 Ajax
 Alcyon
 Amilcar
 Allain et Niguet (AN) (de:Allain et Niguet)
 Ardex
 Arzac
 Astatic
 Astra
 Austral
 Auto Practique (de:Auto Pratique)
 Automobillette (de:Automobilette)
 Autorette (de:Autorette)
 Bédélia
 Benjamin (de:Benjamin)
 Billard (de:Billard)
 Blériot Aéronautique (de:Blériot Aéronautique)
 Benova
 Bollack Netter and Co (B.N.C.)
 Bucciali (Buc)
 Causan
 Coadou et Fleury
 Contal
 (Coudert), see Lurquin-Coudert
 Croissant (de:Croissant)
 De Sanzy
 D'Yrsan
 D'Aux (de:D’Aux)
 De Marçay (de:De Marçay)
 Derby
 Deschamp (de:Deschamps et Cie)
 Désert et de Font-Réault (de:Désert et de Font-Réault)
 Dorey (de:Dorey)
 Eclair (de:Eclair)
 Einaudi (de:Cyclecars Einaudi)
 Elfe
 Emeraude (de:Emeraude)
 G.A.M. (de:G.A.M.)
 G.A.R. (de:G.A.R.)
 Gauthier (de:Gauthier et Cie)
 Griffon (de:Établissements Griffon)
 Grouesy
 HP (de:H.P.)
 Huffit
 Ipsi
 Jack Sport
 Janoir
 Janémian
 JG Sport
 Jouvie
 Julien (de:Julien)
 La Confortable
 La Flèche (de:La Flèche)
 La Perle (de:La Perle)
 La Roulette
 La Violette (de:La Violette)
 Lacour (de:Lacour et Cie)
 Laetitia
 Lafitte
 L.B. (de:L.B.)
 Le Cabri
 Le Favori
 Le Méhari (de:Le Méhari)
 Le Roitelet
 Lurquin-Coudert
 Major (de:Cyclecars Major)
 Marguerite Typ A (de:Marguerite Typ A)
 Marr (de:Max)
 Max (de:Max)
 Molla (de:Molla et Cie)
 Micron (de:Automobiles Micron)
 Molla (de:Molla et Cie)
 Monitor
 Mourre (de:Mourre)
 Noël (de:Noël)
 Orial (de:Orial)
 Patri (de:Patri)
 Pégase (de:Pégase)
 Pestourie et Planchon (de:Pestourie et Planchon)
 Phébus (de:Cyclecars Phébus)
 Quo Vadis
 Rally
 Revol (de:Revol)
 Roll
 Salmson
 Santax
 Sénéchal
 SICAM (de:SICAM)
 SIMA-Violet (de:Sima-Violet)
 Sphinx (de:Sphinx Automobiles)
 Spidos (de:Sphinx Automobiles)
 Super (de:Super)
 Tholomé (de:Tholomé)
 Tic-Tac (de:Tic-Tac)
 Tom Pouce (de:Tom Pouce)
 Utilis (de:Utilis)
 Vaillant
 Villard 
 Violet-Bogey (de:Violet-Bogey)
 Violette
 Viratelle (de:Viratelle)
 Virus
 Weler (de:Weler)
 Zénia (de:Zénia)
 Zévaco (de:Zévaco)

Germany 

 Arimofa
 Bootswerft Zeppelinhafen (B.Z.) (de:Bootswerft Zeppelinhafen)
 Cyklon
 Dehn (de:Fahrzeug- und Maschinenfabrik K. C. Dehn)
 Grade
 Koco
 Minimus Fahrzeugwerk (de:Minimus Fahrzeugwerk)
 Pluto
 Slaby-Beringer (de:Slaby-Beringer)
 Spinell
 Staiger
 Zaschka

Greece 

 Theologou

Italy 

 Amilcar Italiana
 Anzani
 Baroso(Officine Barosso)(de:Officine Barosso)
 C.I.P.(Cyclecar Italiana Petromilli)(de:Cyclecar Italiana Petromilli)
 Della Ferrera(Fratelli Della Ferrera)(de:Fratelli Della Ferrera)
 Marino
 Meldi(Officine Meccanica Giuseppe Meldi)(de:Officine Meccanica Giuseppe Meldi)
 San Giusto(S.A. San Giusto)(de:S.A. San Giusto)
 SIC (Società Italiana Cyclecars) (de:Società Italiana Cyclecars)
 Vaghi(Motovetturette Vaghi)(de:Motovetturette Vaghi)

Poland 

 Cyklonetka
 SKAF

Spain 

 Alvarez
 David
 Izaro
 JBR
 Salvador

Sweden 

 Mascot
 Self

Switzerland 

 Moser (Fritz Moser, Fabrique d’Automobiles et Motocyclettes) (de:Fritz Moser)
 Speidel

United Kingdom 

 AC (Auto Carriers Ltd)
 Adamson
 Aerocar
 Allwyn
 Alvechurch
 Amazon
 Archer
 Armstrong
 Athmac
 Atomette
 Autotrix
 AV
 Baby Blake
 Baker & Dale
 Bantam
 Barnard
 Baughan
 Beacon Motors
 Bell
 Black Prince
 Blériot-Whippet
 Bound
 Bow-V-Car
 BPD
 Bradwell
 Britannia
 Broadway
 Buckingham
 Cambro
 Campion
 Corfield & Hurle (de:C & H)
 Carden
 Carlette
 Carter
 Castle Three
 CFB
 CFL
 Chater-Lea
 Chota
 Coventry Premier
 Coventry Victor
 Crescent
 Cripps
 Crompton
 Crouch
 Cumbria Motors
 CWS
 Cyclar
 Dallison
 Day-Leeds
 Dayton
 Dennis
 Dewcar
 Douglas
 D'Ultra (D-Ultra)
 Duocar
 Dursley-Pedersen
 Economic
 Edmond
 Edmund
 Edwards
 EYME
 GB
 Gerald (de:Gerald Cyclecar)
 Gibbons
 Gillyard
 Glover
 GN
 Gnome
 Gordon (1912-1914)
 Grahame-White
 Guildford
 GWK
 Hampton
 HCE
 Heybourn
 Hill & Stanier
 HMC
 Howard
 Howett
 HP
 Humberette
 Imperial
 Invicta
 Jappic
 JBS
 Jewel
 Jones
 Kendall
 LAD
 La Rapide
 Lambert
 LEC
 Lecoy
 Lester Solus
 Lington
 LM (Little Midland)
 Matchless
 Marcus
 Marlborough (Anglo-French car)
 Mead & Deakin (Medea)
 Medinger(de:Medinger Cars & Engine)
 Menley
 Meteorite Cars(de:Meteorite Cars)
 Metro-Tyler (de:Metro-Tyler)
 Morgan
 New Hudson
 Nomad Cars (de:Nomad Cars)
 Northstar (de:North Star Works)
 Norma
 Paragon (de:Paragon)
 Pickering, Darley & Allday (PDA)
 Pearson & Cox
 Perry
 Premier Motor(PMC) (de:Premier Motor)
 Princess
 Projecta (de:Projecta)
 Pyramid (de:Pyramid)
 Ranger (de:Ranger Cyclecar)
 Rex
 Richardson (1903)
 Richardson (1919)
 Robertson
 Robinson & Price 
 Rollo
 Royal Ruby
 Rene Tondeur (RTC) (de:Rene Tondeur)
 Rudge-Whitworth
 J. A. Ryley (de:J. A. Ryley)
 Simplic
 Skeoch
 Speedy (de:Speedy)
 Sterling
 Stoneleigh
 Swift
 Tamplin
 T.B.
 Tiny
 Turner
 Unique (de:Unique)
 VAL
 Vee Gee
 Victor
 Wall
 Warne
 Warren-Lambert
 Westall
 Wherwell
 Whitgift (de:Whitgift)
 Wilbrook
 Willis
 Winson
 Wooler
 Wrigley
 WSC 
 Winter
 Woodrow
 Xtra
 Zendik

United States 

 American
 Argo
 Arrow
 Asheville
 Beisel
 Buick prototype built by Walter Lorenzo Marr
 Briggs & Stratton Flyersee Smith Flyer 
 Bull Moose-Cutting Automobile Company Baby Moose(de:Bull Moose-Cutting Automobile Company)
 Burrows(1914 Ripley NY)
 Car-Nation
 Ceco(Continental Engineering Company)(de:Continental Engineering Company)
 Coey
 Comet
 Continental Engine Manufacturing Company(de:Continental Engine Manufacturing Company)
 Cycle-Car
 Cyclops (de:Cyclops Cyclecar)
 Dayton (de:Dayton Cyclecar)
 De La Vergne
 Delco
 De Soto (1914)
 Dodo
 Dudly Bug
 Economy car
 EIM
 Engler
 Falcon
 Fenton
 Geneva
 Greyhound
 Hall
 Hanover
 Hawk
 Hawkins
 Hoosier Scout
 IMP
 JPL
 Kearns LuLu
 Keller (de:Keller Cyclecar)
 La Vigne
 Limit
 Logan
 Malcolm Jones
 Merz
 Michaelson
 Mecca
 Mercury
 Motor Bob
 O-We-Go
 Pacific
 Pioneer
 Portland
 Post
 Prigg
 Puritan
 Real
 Rex
 Saginaw
 Scripps-Booth
 Smith Flyer
 Strouse, S.R.K.
 Storms Electric
 Trumbull
 Twombly
 Vixen
 Winthur
 Wizzard
 Woods
 Xenia
 Yankee

See also 
 Brass Era car
 Microcar
 Voiturette

References

Further reading 

 
 

Car classifications
 
Brass Era vehicles
1910s cars